Siloam School may refer to:

Siloam Junior High School, Siloam, Georgia, listed on the National Register of Historic Places in Greene County, Georgia
Siloam School (Charlotte, North Carolina), listed on the National Register of Historic Places in Mecklenburg County, North Carolina
Siloam School (Eastover, South Carolina), listed on the National Register of Historic Places in Richland County, South Carolina